Mount Columbia is a high mountain summit of the Collegiate Peaks in the Sawatch Range of the Rocky Mountains of North America. The mountain was named by Roger W. Toll in honor of his alma mater, Columbia University, and in commemoration of its rowing victory at the renowned Henley Royal Regatta in 1878.

Mountain
Along with nearby Mount Harvard, Mount Yale, Mount Princeton, and Mount Oxford, Mount Columbia is one of five Collegiate Peaks named for prominent universities. Due to a notoriously challenging scree field located on the standard route, Mount Columbia is usually only climbed by those wishing to climb all of Colorado's fourteeners. The forest service recommends that hikers take the user-created Horn Fork Basin Route, an 11-mile roundtrip that gains 5,800 feet in elevation. The area near the scree field is severely eroded, and although there are efforts to build a new trail to replace the current user-created trail, the formal trail has not yet been completed.

See also

List of mountain peaks of Colorado
List of Colorado fourteeners

References

External links

 
Mount Columbia on Summitpost
Mount Columbia on Bivouac

Mountains of Colorado
Mountains of Chaffee County, Colorado
Fourteeners of Colorado
North American 4000 m summits